Ibraykino (İbray) is a rural locality (a village) in Bizhbulyaksky Selsoviet, Bizhbulyaksky District, Bashkortostan, Russia. The population was 20 as of 2010. There is 1 street.

Geography 
Ibraykino is located 10 km southeast of Bizhbulyak (the district's administrative centre) by road. Verkhnyaya Kurmaza is the nearest rural locality.

References 

Rural localities in Bizhbulyaksky District